Agrotis obesa is a moth of the family Noctuidae. It is found from south-eastern Europe, the Near East and the Middle East to China. In North Africa, it is known from Morocco to Algeria.

Adults are on wing from September to October. There is one generation per year.

The larvae feed on various low-growing herbaceous plants.

Subspecies
Agrotis obesa obesa (south-western Europe, Morocco, Algeria)
Agrotis obesa scytha (Greece to south-western Russia, Turkestan, Caucasus, Armenia, Turkey, Syria, Iraq, Iran)

References

External links 

Lepiforum.de

Agrotis
Moths of Europe
Moths of Asia
Moths of Africa
Moths described in 1829
Taxa named by Jean Baptiste Boisduval